Before the Time Comes is a Canadian drama film, directed by Anne Claire Poirier and released in 1975. The film stars Luce Guilbeault as Hélène, a housewife and mother who is raising her three children largely on her own without much help from her itinerant sailor husband Gabriel (Pierre Gobeil); when she becomes pregnant for a fourth time, she struggles both with her conscience and the opinions of her husband and her sister Monique (Paule Baillargeon) as she considers whether or not to have an abortion.

It was the first Canadian film ever to address the subject of abortion.

The film opened in Quebec theatres in 1975, and was subsequently screened in the International Critics' Week program at the 1976 Cannes Film Festival.

References

External links 
 

1975 films
1975 drama films
Canadian drama films
Films directed by Anne Claire Poirier
National Film Board of Canada films
Films about abortion
1970s French-language films
French-language Canadian films
1970s Canadian films